The Torodome is a 4,100 seat multi-purpose stadium in Carson, California. It primarily serves as the home of the Cal State Dominguez Hills Toros basketball teams. It is also host every spring to the California Interscholastic Federation Los Angeles City section basketball championships. The Torodome has also been used for CSUDH Graduation ceremonies, and various other regional sporting events.

References 

Carson, California
Sports venues in Los Angeles County, California